The Benedictine Ravens football program is a college football team that represents Benedictine College in the Heart of America Athletic Conference, a part of the NAIA. The team has had 14 head coaches overall since its first recorded football game in 1920. The current coach is Larry Wilcox who first took the position for the 1979 season.

Key

Coaches
Statistics correct as of the end of the 2022 college football season.

See also
 List of people from Atchison County, Kansas

Notes

References

Lists of college football head coaches

Kansas sports-related lists